Hans van Steenwinckel may refer to:
 Hans van Steenwinckel the Elder (c. 1545–1601), Flemish architect and sculptor  
 Hans van Steenwinckel the Younger (1587–1639), Danish architect and sculptor, son of the Elder
 Hans van Steenwinckel the Youngest (1638–1700), Danish architect and sculptor, son of the Younger

See also
van Steenwinckel, surname